Self-Portrait is an oil on canvas painting by Simon Vouet, executed c. 1626–1627, painted during his stay in Rome as a protégé of Pope Urban VIII and cardinal del Monte, before Louis XIII recalled him to France in 1627. It may have been produced as a marriage gift to his new wife Virginia Vezzi, whom Vouet married in 1626, the same year as he began the self-portrait. It is now in the Musée des Beaux-Arts de Lyon.

References

Vouet, Simon
1626 paintings
1627 paintings
Vouet, Simon
Vouet, Simon
Paintings in the collection of the Museum of Fine Arts of Lyon
Paintings by Simon Vouet